The International Women's Society (IWS) in Lagos, Nigeria is a Nigerian women's organization. The IWS was founded in 1957.

The International Women's Society carries our charitable activity in Nigeria. It provides for the less privileged, financially supports widows, and helps women gain skills enabling their productive independence.

Presidents
The IWS has elected a new president each year.

 1957/58:  Mrs. Remi Doherty
 1959: Mrs. Majorie Maclaren
 1960: Amb. Aduke Alakija
 1961: Lady Kofo Ademola
 1962: Mrs. Kennedy
 1963: Dr. (Mrs.) M. A. Silva
 1964: Dr. (Mrs.) A. Aziz
 1965: Chief (Mrs.) Shodeinde
 1966: Miss Vera Creaton
 1967: Chief (Mrs.) Uyi Taylor
 1968: Mrs. Wooten-Wooley
 1969: Prof (Mrs.) Juliet MaCauley
 1970: Mrs. M. Darvani: 
 1971: Chief (Mrs.) Hilda Ogunbanjo
 1972: Mrs. C. Raeburn
 1973: Dr. (Mrs.) Grace Guobadia.
 1974: Mrs. Mackay
 1975: Mrs. D. Paul
 1976: Mrs. Norah Bell
 1977: Lady Ayo Alakija
 1978: Mrs. P. Nork
 1979: Chief (Mrs.) Y. Oyediran
 1980: Mrs. Kavita Chanrai
 1981: Mrs. Adetoun Bailey
 1982: Mrs. Jean Abili
 1983: Chief (Mrs.) Toyin Olakunrin
 1984: Mrs. F. Ghista
 1985: Mrs. Perla Amu
 1986: Mrs. Gbemi Rosiji 
 1987: Mrs. Doris Fafunwa
 1988: Mrs. Grace Etim
 1989: Mrs. Phebean Ogundipe
 1990: Dr. (Mrs.) Katia Ekesi
 1991: Mrs. Demi Ibare-Akisan
 1992: Mrs. Laide Sasegbon
 1993: Mrs. Olugbo Hollist
 1994: Chief (Mrs.) Sarita Agrawal
 1995: Mrs. Adeyola David
 1996: Dame. Marie Fatayi-Williams
 1997: Chief (Mrs.) Funke Arthur-Worrey
 1998: Mrs. Ijeoma Chuks-Asala
 1999: Mrs. Sonja Ally
 2000: Chief (Mrs.) Morin Agboola
 2001: Mrs. Amita Jain
 2002: Mrs. Aminat Hamzat Ahmadu
 2003: Mrs. Stella Obiageli Ugboma
 2004: Mrs. R. O. Akinsete
 2005: Mrs. Grace Oluremi Omotosho
 2006: Chief Marlies Allan
 2007: Mrs. Gbemi Shasore
 2008: Ms. Augusta Chibututu
 2009: Mrs. Sicily Jacob
 2010: Mrs. Ekuah Abudu.
 2011: Mrs. Cecilia Aqua-Umoren
 2012: Mrs. Evelyn Akeredolu
 2013: Mrs. Grace Kalango
 2014: Mrs. Folasade Oyeniyi
 2015: Hajiya Zainab Saleh
 2016: Mrs. Izarene Adams
 2017: Mrs. Ego Boyo.
 2018: Mrs. Abimbola Bawaallah.
 2019: Mrs. Nkoli Ogbolu.
 2020: Mrs Ibiwunmi Akinnola.

References

External links
 

Women's organizations based in Nigeria
Organizations established in 1957